Clark Betton Cochrane (May 31, 1815 – March 5, 1867) was a U.S. Representative from New York.

Born in New Boston, New Hampshire, Cochrane moved to Montgomery County, New York.
He was graduated from Union College, Schenectady, New York, in 1841.
He studied law.
He was admitted to the bar in 1841 and practiced in Amsterdam 1841–1851, Schenectady 1851–1855, and Albany, New York, from 1855 until his death.

Cochrane was elected as a Republican a member of the New York State Assembly (Montgomery Co.) in 1844.
Trustee of Union College 1853–1867.

Cochrane was elected as a Republican to the Thirty-fifth and Thirty-sixth Congresses (March 4, 1857 – March 3, 1861).
He was not a candidate for renomination in 1860.
He resumed the practice of law in Albany.
He served as delegate to the Republican National Convention in 1864.
He was again a member of the State Assembly (Albany Co., 3rd D.) in 1866.
He died in Albany, New York, on March 5, 1867.
He was interred in Green Hill Cemetery, Amsterdam, New York.

References

1815 births
1867 deaths
People from New Boston, New Hampshire
People from Amsterdam, New York
Politicians from Schenectady, New York
Politicians from Albany, New York
Union College (New York) alumni
New York (state) lawyers
New York (state) Democrats
Members of the New York State Assembly
Republican Party members of the United States House of Representatives from New York (state)
19th-century American politicians
Lawyers from Albany, New York
19th-century American lawyers